This is a list of lighthouses in Austria. Although Austria is a landlocked country, it has a number of lakes that are navigated by passenger ships and leisure boats.

Lighthouses

See also 
 Lists of lighthouses and lightvessels

References

External links 

 

Lighthouses
Austria